All Golds Tour may refer to:
1907–08 New Zealand rugby tour of Australia and Great Britain, the original New Zealand national rugby league team or "All Golds" tour
2007 All Golds Tour, the New Zealand national rugby league team's centenary tour